Micheline Presle (born Micheline Nicole Julia Émilienne Chassagne; 22 August 1922) is a French actress. She was sometimes billed as Micheline Prelle. Starting in 1939, she starred in over 50 French and English language films that were made in Hollywood and in France.

Life and career
Born in Paris, she wanted to be an actress from an early age. She took acting classes in her early teens and made her film debut at the age of 15 in the 1937 production of La Fessée. In 1938, she was awarded the Prix Suzanne Bianchetti as the most promising young actress in French cinema. Her rise to European stardom, in films such as Devil in the Flesh, led to offers from Hollywood, and in 1950, she was signed by 20th Century Fox. 

20th Century Fox executives changed Presle's last name to Prell. It was later changed to  Prelle after a soap company brought out Prell shampoo. Her first Hollywood production was a starring role opposite John Garfield in the film Under My Skin directed by Jean Negulesco. That same year, director Fritz Lang cast her opposite Tyrone Power in the war drama American Guerrilla in the Philippines.  In 1950, she became the second wife of American actor William Marshall with whom she had a daughter, Tonie. William Marshall had teamed up with actor Errol Flynn and his production company, and in 1951 he directed  Flynn and her in the film Adventures of Captain Fabian.

Presle's marriage did not last, and she returned to France, divorcing Marshall in 1954. Her career flourished in French films, and in 1957, she was a guest on the American Ed Sullivan Show. In 1959, she performed in the United Kingdom English-language production of Blind Date directed by Joseph Losey. She returned to Hollywood in 1962 for the role of Sandra Dee's mother in the Universal Studios film If a Man Answers, which also featured Dee's husband, singer Bobby Darin. The following year, Presle acted again in English in The Prize starring Paul Newman. She did not make another English film, but after performing in more than 50 films in French, in 1989, she appeared in the French-made bilingual production I Want to Go Home, for which she was nominated for the César Award for Best Actress in a Supporting Role.

In 1971, Presle signed the Manifesto of the 343, publicly declaring she had an illegal abortion.

Selected filmography 

 Girls in Distress (1939)
 They Were Twelve Women (1940)
 Paradise Lost (1940)
 Comedy of Happiness (1940)
 Ecco la felicità (1940)
 They Were Twelve Women (1940)
 Parade en 7 nuits (1941)
 Histoire de rire (1941)
 La Nuit fantastique (1942)
 The Beautiful Adventure (1942)
 Le soleil a toujours raison (1943)
 Un seul amour (1943)
 Paris Frills (1945)
 Twilight (1945)
 Fausse alerte (1945)
 Boule de suif (1945)
 Les jeux sont faits (1947)
 Devil in the Flesh (1947)
 All Roads Lead to Rome (1949)
 The Last Days of Pompeii (1950)
 Under My Skin (1950)
 American Guerrilla in the Philippines (1950)
 Adventures of Captain Fabian (1951)
 The Lady of the Camellias (1953)
 It Happened in the Park (1953)
 The Love of a Woman (1953)
 Les Impures (1954)
 House of Ricordi (1954)
 Napoléon (1955)
 Thirteen at the Table (1955)
 Beatrice Cenci (1956)
 The Bride Is Much Too Beautiful (1956)
 Christine (1958)
 Blind Date (1959)
  (1960)
  (1960) 
 Mistress of the World (1960)
  (1961)
 Five Day Lover (1961)
 The Assassin (1961)
 Time Out for Love (1961)
 The Italian Brigands (1961)
 Le Diable et les Dix Commandements (1962)
 If a Man Answers (1962)
 Venere Imperiale (1962)
 The Law of Men (1962)
 Combat! Just For the Record   (1962)
 The Bamboo Stroke (1963)
 The Prize (1963)
 Dark Purpose (1964)
 Male Hunt (1964)
 Je vous salue, mafia! (1965)
 Le Roi de Cœur (1966)
 Peau d'Âne (1970)
 The Legend of Frenchie King (1971)
 Devil in the Brain (1972)
 Clochemerle (1972)
 Thieves After Dark (1984)
 Fanfan (1993)  
 Les Misérables (1995)
 Le coeur à l'ouvrage (2000)
 Chouchou (2003)
 Vous êtes de la police ? (2007)
 Musée haut, musée bas (2008)
 A Man and His Dog (2009)
 Going South (2009)
 Thelma, Louise et Chantal (2010)
 Hitler in Hollywood (2011)

References

Further reading

External links

 
 Micheline Presle at Allocine (French language)

1922 births
Living people
20th-century French actresses
21st-century French actresses
French centenarians
French film actresses
Actresses from Paris
French expatriate actresses in the United States
César Honorary Award recipients
Women centenarians
Signatories of the 1971 Manifesto of the 343